Gaylor Curier is a French basketball player for Cholet Basket of the French LNB Pro A.

Personal
Curier measures 1.96 m. 

He is a native of Massy, Essonne.

Professional career
Curier started his career playing for sub teams of Élan Béarnais. He later transferred to Limoges CSP where he won the French national championship in 2014.

After leaving Limoges, he went on to play for the LNB Pro B team Angers BC 49.

During the 2015/15 LNB Pro B season, he played for BC Souffelweyersheim. Later, he joined league competitor Rouen Métropole Basket. In the following years he played for Orléans Loiret Basket and BCM Gravelines-Dunkerque.

In February 2021, he joined Lille Métropole BC. 

In July 2021, he joined SIG Strasbourg.

On August 9, 2022, he has signed with Cholet Basket of the French LNB Pro A.

Player profile
In 2021, SIG Strasbourg's coach Lassi Tuovi stated that Strasbourg acquired Curier because of his shooting ability and his flexibility as Curier can play multiple positions.

References

External links
Profile at Basketball Champions League
Profile at Eurobasket.com
Profile at basketball-reference

1992 births
Living people
Cholet Basket players
French men's basketball players
People from Massy, Essonne
Shooting guards
SIG Basket players
Small forwards